Thermithiobacillus tepidarius (from the Latin tepidarium; a warm bath fed by natural thermal water) is a member of the Acidithiobacillia isolated from the thermal groundwaters of the Roman Baths at Bath, Somerset, United Kingdom. It was previously placed in the genus Thiobacillus.
The organism is a moderate thermophile, and an obligate aerobic chemolithotrophic autotroph. Despite having an optimum pH of 6.0–7.5, growth can continue to an acid medium of pH 4.8. Growth can only occur on reduced inorganic sulfur compounds (thiosulfate, polythionates from trithionate to octathionate pace pentathionate, sulfide) and elementary sulfur, but unlike some species in other genus of the same family, Acidithiobacillus, Thermithiobacillus spp. are unable to oxidise ferrous iron or iron-containing minerals.

The genome sequence was completed in 2016.

References

External links
Type strain of Thermithiobacillus tepidarius at BacDive -  the Bacterial Diversity Metadatabase

Thermithiobacillus
Thermithiobacillaceae
Acidithiobacillales
Acidithiobacillia
Bacteria described in 1985